Ornithopoda is a clade of ornithischian dinosaurs, called ornithopods, that started out as small, bipedal running grazers and grew in size and numbers until they became one of the most successful groups of herbivores in the Cretaceous world, dominating the North American land. Their major evolutionary advantage was the progressive development of a chewing apparatus that became the most sophisticated ever developed by a non-avian dinosaur, rivaling that of modern mammals such as the domestic cow. They reached their apex of diversity and ecological dominance in the hadrosaurids (colloquially known as 'duck-bills'), before they were wiped out by the Cretaceous–Paleogene extinction event along with all other non-avian dinosaurs. Members are known from all seven continents, though they are generally rare in the Southern Hemisphere.

History of research
In 1870, Thomas Henry Huxley listed Iguanodontidae (coined by Cope a year earlier) as one of his three families of dinosaurs (alongside Megalosauridae and Scelidosauridae), including within it the genera Iguanodon, Hypsilophodon, and Hadrosaurus, in addition to Cetiosaurus and tentatively Stenopelix. The term Ornithopoda was erected by Othniel Charles Marsh in 1881 as part of his then still ongoing investigation of the classification of Dinosauria. It was considered one of the four definite orders of dinosaurs, the others being Theropoda, Sauropoda, and Stegosauria (Hallopoda was considered a possible fifth). He subdivided the order into three families: Camptonotidae, Iguanodontidae, and Hadrosauridae; the former was a new name, whereas the latter two were carried over from the nomenclatures of Huxley and Edward Drinker Cope respectively. Within Camptonotidae he included the European Hypsilophodon and three American taxa he named himself, Camptonotus, Laosaurus, and Nanosaurus. Camptonotus was in 1885 renamed to Camptosaurus, as the original name was pre-occupied by a cricket; the associated family followed suit, becoming Camptosauridae. In Iguanodontidae, only found in Europe, he included Iguanodon and Vectisaurus. In Hadrosauridae, he included Hadrosaurus, Cionodon, and tentatively Agathaumas.

Description

Ornithopoda means "bird feet", from the Greek ornithos ("bird") and pous ("feet"); this is in reference to members’ characteristic three-toed feet, although many early forms retained four toes. They were also characterized as lacking in body armour, not developing a horny beak, having an elongated pubis (that eventually extended past the ilium), and having a missing hole in the lower jaw (a Mandibular fenestrae). A variety of ornithopods, and related cerapods, had thin cartilaginous plates along the outside of the ribs; in some cases, these plates mineralized and were fossilized. The function of these intercostal plates is unknown. They have been found with Hypsilophodon, Othnielosaurus, Parksosaurus, Talenkauen, Thescelosaurus, and Macrogryphosaurus to date.

The early ornithopods were only about 1 metre (3 feet) long, but probably very fast. They had a stiff tail, like the theropods, to help them balance as they ran on their hind legs. Later ornithopods became more adapted to grazing on all fours; their spines curved, and came to resemble the spines of modern ground-feeders, such as the bison. As they became more adapted to eating while bent over, they became facultative quadrupeds; still running on two legs, and comfortable reaching up into trees, but spending most of their time walking or grazing on all fours. The taxonomy of dinosaurs previously ascribed to the Hypsilophodontidae is problematic. The group previously consisted of all non-iguanodontian bipedal ornithischians, but a phylogenetic reappraisal has shown such species to be paraphyletic. As such, the hypsilophodont family is currently represented only by Hypsilophodon.

Later ornithopods became larger, but never rivalled the incredible size of the long-necked, long-tailed sauropods that they partially supplanted. The very largest, such as Shantungosaurus, were as heavy as medium-sized sauropods (up to 23 metric tons/25 short tons), but never grew much beyond 15 metres (50 feet).

Classification

Historically, most indeterminate ornithischian bipeds were lumped in as ornithopods. Most have since been reclassified.

Taxonomy
Ornithopoda is usually given the rank of Suborder, within the order Ornithischia. While ranked taxonomy has largely fallen out of favour among dinosaur paleontologists, some researchers have continued to employ such a classification, though sources have differed on what its rank should be. Benton (2004) placed it as an infraorder within the suborder Cerapoda (originally named as an unranked clade), while others, such as Ibiricu et al. 2010, have retained it at its traditional ranking of suborder.

Phylogeny
In 2021, Ornithopoda was given a formal definition under the PhyloCode: "The largest clade containing Iguanodon bernissartensis but not Pachycephalosaurus wyomingensis and Triceratops horridus."
The cladogram below follows a 2017 analysis by Madzia et al.:

References

External links
 GEOL 104 dinosaurs: a Natural history, ornithopoda: beaks, bills & crests, by Thomas R. Holtz Jr.

 
Bajocian first appearances
Maastrichtian extinctions
Taxa named by Othniel Charles Marsh